Zab River may refer to:

Great Zab, or Upper Zab, a tributary to the Tigris
Little Zab, or Lower Zab, a tributary to the Tigris